Lal Chand Ukrani is a Pakistani politician who had been a Member of the Provincial Assembly of Sindh, from June 2013 to May 2018. He has been elected again to the Provincial Assembly of Sindh as a candidate of Pakistan Peoples Party on reserved seat for minorities in 2018 Pakistani general election.

Early life and education 
He was born on 1 February 1969 in Jamshoro.

He has done Bachelor of Medicine and Bachelor of Surgery from Liaquat University of Medical Health Sciences, Jamshoro.

Political career

He was elected to the Provincial Assembly of Sindh as a candidate of Pakistan Peoples Party on reserved seat for minorities in 2013 Pakistani general election.
He has been elected again to the Provincial Assembly of Sindh as a candidate of Pakistan Peoples Party on reserved seat for minorities in 2018 Pakistani general election.

References

Living people
Sindh MPAs 2013–2018
Pakistan People's Party MPAs (Sindh)
1969 births